Nirav Deepak Modi (born 27 February 1971) is a Belgian businessman and fugitive who was charged by Interpol and the government of India for criminal conspiracy, criminal breach of trust, cheating and dishonesty including delivery of property, corruption, money laundering, fraud, embezzlement and breach of contract in August 2018. Modi is being investigated as a part of the $2 billion fraud case of Punjab National Bank (PNB). In March 2018, Modi applied for bankruptcy protection in Manhattan, New York. In June 2018, Modi was reported to be in the UK where he reportedly applied for political asylum. In June 2019, Swiss authorities froze a total of US$6 million present in Nirav Modi's Swiss bank accounts along with the assets.

Biography

Early life
Nirav Modi was born in Palanpur, Gujarat, and grew up in Antwerp, Belgium. His family has been in the diamond business for several generations. When he was 19, he and his father Deepak Modi moved to Mumbai to work in his uncle's business, Mehul Choksi, the head of Gitanjali Group, a retail jewellery company with 4,000 stores in India.

Modi attended the Wharton School at the University of Pennsylvania but eventually dropped out. While studying, he met his future wife, Ami, the daughter of a diamond businessman Amukuraj Choksey.

Career 
After moving to India in 1989, and training in all aspects of the diamond trading business, Modi founded Firestar in 1999 (formerly known as Firestone), a diamond sourcing and trading company. Firestar is the exclusive distributor of Rio Tinto’s Argyle pink diamonds in India.

In 2002, his company started manufacturing jewellery on a contract basis. He acquired Frederick Goldman in 2005, and Sandberg & Sikorski and A.Jaffe in 2007 in the USA.

In 2008, a close friend asked Modi to make a pair of earrings, after which he created the brand. In 2010 he launched a diamond store bearing his name in New Delhi's Defence Colony, followed by one in Mumbai's Kala Ghoda. 17 other store openings followed across the world. Modi launched globally with boutiques in New York City and Hong Kong in 2015, followed by two other boutiques opened in Hong Kong in 2016. and one in MGM Macau in 2016.

He became well known after he designed his "Golconda Lotus Necklace" with an old, 12-carat, pear-shaped diamond as a centerpiece in 2010. The diamond was earlier sold in the 1960s; it was repolished. It featured a lattice of white and pink diamonds. It was included on the cover of Christie’s catalogue in Hong Kong, and was auctioned for US$3.6 million in 2010. In 2012, the Riviere of Perfection, featuring 36 flawless white diamonds weighing a total of 88.88 carats, was sold at Sotheby’s Hong Kong auction.

It is believed that he was overextended for several years and used new MOUs to pay for the past ones for about seven years. One of his employees has stated that, "He wanted to grow his business, and to do in five years what might otherwise have taken 20 years." He claimed that "If he’d gone public, maybe he could have pledged his equity, raised some money, and finally paid the bank back. Perhaps he would have done that."

Dealings with Union Bank of India
The Union Bank of India sued Modi in a Hong Kong court. Union Bank claimed in a writ filed at the High Court on 26 September 2018 that Modi guaranteed two loans made to Firestone Trading Private on 21 October 2011 and Firestar Diamond on 15 November 2011. The bank demanded that he pay more than $5.49 million plus interest after both firms allegedly defaulted on repayments.

2018 Investigation and Lawsuits (PNB fraud case)

In February 2018, the Indian government's Central Bureau of Investigation (CBI) launched an investigation of Modi, acting on a complaint from the Punjab National Bank alleging Modi and his partners defrauded the bank of ₹28000 Crore (approximately US$4 billion) by conspiring with bank officials to fraudulently obtain Letters of Undertaking for making payments to overseas suppliers. While ₹28000 Crore is the fraud that has been alleged to date, the potential loss to Punjab National Bank is reported to be up to ₹11000 Crore. The Enforcement Directorate (ED) is looking into the case of fraud that the CBI has registered against him.

A few of Modi's stores initially remained open for business as usual, including the one at Marina Bay Sands in Singapore, however these have gradually all closed. On 7 March 2018, Modi's firm Firestar Diamond Inc. applied for bankruptcy protection at a Manhattan bankruptcy court, in order to protect its assets in the United States and their revolving credit facility with Israel Discount Bank.

Modi responded to the bank on 15/16 February 2018, stating that "In the anxiety to recover your dues immediately, despite my offer (on 13 February, a day before the public announcement, and on 15) your actions have destroyed my brand and the business and have now restricted your ability to recover all the dues leaving a trail of unpaid debts". Modi estimated his domestic business at around Rs 6,500 Crore, and said "this could have helped reduce/discharge the debt to the banking system," but claimed that this is now impossible as all his bank accounts have been frozen and assets have been seized. Modi bought a Rs 900 crore sea-facing property in Mumbai's coveted Samudra Mahal  properties with his wife Ami Modi. His properties in India, including jewellery, paintings, and real estate, worth about Rs 523 crore (about $75 million) have been attached by the Enforcement Directorate.

The Enforcement Directorate (ED) attached four wind power plants, owned by Modi, in Rajasthan with a total capacity of 9.6 megawatt (MW). The plants earn up to Rs 5 crore a year due to share purchase agreement with Rajasthan's state electricity board. These wind power plants have been operational since 2014–15. In March 2018, the ED had attached a 5.24 MW solar power plant spread over 135 acres in Karjat in Ahmednagar district worth Rs 60 crore. In May 2018, the CBI and the ED had registered two FIRs each to probe the case. Both Modi and Mehul Choksi are said to have left the country before criminal cases were lodged against them.

With the collapse of his brand, Modi's fortune has collapsed. Forbes removed him from their annual billionaires list, and on 9 March 2018, estimated his current wealth to be less than $100 million. As a result of the fiasco, the RBI has stopped issuing LoUs and LoCs for imports, which has limited the financial flexibility of importers. His company, A.JAFFE, acquired through his Synergies Corporation, was auctioned in May 2018 and was purchased by Parag Diamond. All the stores have been since closed.

In April 2018, it was alleged Modi had found safe haven in Hong Kong, but in June of that year he was reported to be in the UK where he applied for asylum, claiming he was a victim of "political persecution" and denying any wrongdoing. In March 2019, Modi was reported have been sighted in the UK by The Telegraph. It was said that he was living in an apartment costing £8 million. Indian authorities responded to the report by saying that an extradition request had been made to the UK. On 20 March 2019, he was arrested in London after a warrant was issued against him. Later that month, Indian tax authorities raised $8m by auctioning some of his art collection. Modi applied for bail in the UK High Court on May 31, a day after his remand was extended. All his requests for bail have been rejected as of October 2020.

On 8 June 2020, the Prevention of Money Laundering Act (PMLA) Court has ordered a confiscation of nearly Rs 1,400 crores worth of his property.

On 25 February 2021, a UK court allowed the Indian government's request to have Modi extradited to India as a key accused in the PNB fraud case. The UK Home Secretary signed the extradition order on April 15, the next step in clearing the path for his deportation to India. Modi then had 14 days to appeal the decision to the UK High Court, which he did on 1 May, claiming that he would not get a fair trial in India. The extradition appeal could take months; while Modi remains imprisoned at Wandsworth Prison in south-west London. On 23 June 2021, a UK high court rejected Modi's application to appeal against his extradition to India.

The October 2021 Pandora Papers showed that his sister, Purvi Modi, set up an offshore firm just one month before he fled India.

During December 2022, the Royal Courts of Justice in London refused permission for Nirav Modi to appeal to the UK Supreme Court about the order from the UK Home Secretary in April 2021 ordering his extradition to India, and ordered him to pay legal fees of £150,247.

Sale of assets
In March 2019, 68 works from Modi's art collection, were sold on behalf of India's income tax department. The artwork was sold for £5.3m including a Vasudeo S. Gaitonde painting that sold for £2.6m. The iconic music store Rhythm House, at Kala Ghoda,  Mumbai, is planned to be auctioned after its value is determined. It was bought by Nirav Modi in 2017.

Achievements and recognition
 2010: 1st Indian jeweller to be featured on the covers of Christie's and Sotheby’s Catalogues.
 2013: Featured on the Forbes list of Indian billionaires.
 Patents: Jasmine cut diamond, United States Design Patent USD763118S1, JEWELRY DESIGN, United States Design Patent US D738,777 S.

Personal life
Nirav Modi is married to Ami Modi, they have three children - two daughters and one son. They met when both were students at the Wharton School of the University of Pennsylvania, although Modi himself dropped out after a year to return to the diamond business.

Ami is a US citizen by birth. In spite of having been a billionaire family earlier, they have attempted to raise children conservatively, and they only use Gujarati in their home. She ran the "Nirav Modi Scholarship for Excellence", which supported 250 students every year. 

After leaving India, they had been reported to have been living in a JW Marriott Essex House suite in New York City.

See also
 List of fugitives from justice who disappeared

References
 

1971 births
21st-century Indian criminals 
Living people 
Corporate crime
Jewellery retailers of India
Fugitives wanted by India
Indian jewellery designers
Indian money launderers 
Indian criminals 
Indian fraudsters
Gujarati people 
Belgian people of Indian descent
Businesspeople from Gujarat 
People named in the Pandora Papers
People from Gujarat 
People convicted of making false statements